Tri-County Airport  is a public-use airport located 5.1 nautical miles (8.2 km) northeast of the central business district of the city of Bonifay in Holmes County, Florida, United States and 5.3 miles northwest of the central business district of Chipley, in Washington County Florida (in the western Florida panhandle).  Created by an act of the Florida legislature in 1969, the airport is publicly owned and serves the Florida communities of Bonifay, Chipley and Graceville, as well as serving as a feeder/general aviation airport for Panama City, Florida and Dothan, Alabama.

Facilities and aircraft 
It has one runway designated 01/19 with an asphalt surface measuring 5,398 by 75 feet (1,645 x 22.9 m).

For the 12-month period ending December 31, 2021, the airport had 28,376 aircraft operations, an average of 78 per day: 70% military, 30% general aviation, and less than 1% air taxi. As of May 24, 2022, there are 40 aircraft based at this airport: 10% multi-engine and 90% single-engine.  Corporate jet aircraft began basing at the large north (corporate) hangars in 2022.

The airport provides commercial hangars, large hangars, box hangars, T-hangars, shade hangars and tie-downs. It provides a fuel discount to tenants with a current lease. The airport terminal building (open 24 hours daily) includes a pilot lounge, conference room, kitchen, break room, restrooms and shower (with internet connection information posted in the lobby), and an airport office. There is an oversized couch in the lobby should pilots need to sleep overnight. Self-service fuel is available from an automated pump 24 hours; a helipad is adjacent to the fuel pumps.

In March 2023 the airport completed a major terminal improvement and security project that greatly enhanced public parking, added pedestrian security to the terminal, revamped the septic system and added new signage.  There are significant additional projects planned by the airport and the Florida Department of Transportation to include remarking of the runway and taxiways, major electrical upgrades and storm water mitigation.

Tri-County Airport Authority 
The public-use airport is governed by the Tri-County Airport Authority, an independent authority created by the Florida legislature in July 1969.  The County Commissioners of Holmes, Jackson and Washington County (Florida) each appoint 3 members who serve three-year terms on the board as unpaid volunteers.  The board meets at the airport conference room on the second Tuesday afternoon of every month at 5:00 PM and it’s meeting agendas, proceedings and reports are published on its public website. Members of the Board are local to the area and are made up of pilots and non-pilots who have an interest in the welfare of the airport and surrounding community.

Notable tenants and services 
Skydive Panama City is a commercial operation that has skydiving operations which are active most weekends.

There is flight instruction and maintenance available on the field. A full time airport manager is on the field during business hours, Monday through Friday, with after hour callouts available for an additional fee; calls to the main airport number after hours forward to his cell phone.

The airport is served by Enterprise Rent-A-Car and Hertz, with three days' notice. This can be discussed with the airport manager.

On November 5, 2020, the common traffic advisory frequency changed to 122.725 and on December 2, 2022 the airport identifier changed from 1J0 to KBCR and a second instrument approach (RNAV 01) was added.

References

External links

Airports in Florida
Transportation buildings and structures in Holmes County, Florida